Carl Woolworth Weilman (November 29, 1889 – May 25, 1924), was a professional baseball pitcher in the Major Leagues from –. He played for the St. Louis Browns.

Weilman is one of the few players in baseball history to strike out six times in one game, and the first player recorded to have done so.

References

External links

1889 births
1924 deaths
Major League Baseball pitchers
Baseball players from Ohio
St. Louis Browns players
Maysville Rivermen players